The Way To Save Ourselves is an EP by None the Less which was released on 25 May 2009. The album was recorded at EAS Studios in Milton Keynes and was produced by Ed Sokolowski.

Track listing 
 "The Payout"
 "News Of A Cancer"
 "Define"
 "(Interlude)..."
 "I Had The World Resting On Me"
 "Four 4's"
 "I'll Feel Like Your Enemy"

Personnel
 Anthony Giannacini — Vocals
 Owen Harvey – Guitar, Screams and Backing Vocals
 Joe Page — Guitar, Backing Vocals
 Oli Stanton — Bass
 Mike Smith – Drums

Singles 

2009 debut EPs
None the Less albums
Self-released EPs